Zach Savich (born December 1, 1982, in Lansing, Michigan) is an American poet.

Life
Savich is the author of the poetry collections Full Catastrophe Living (University of Iowa Press, 2009) which won the 2008 Iowa Poetry Prize; Annulments (University of Colorado Press, 2010) which won the 2010 Colorado Prize for Poetry; and The Firestorm (Cleveland State University Poetry Center, 2011) which won the 2010 Cleveland State University Poetry Center Open Competition. He is also the author of the chapbook The Man Who Lost His Head (Omnidawn, 2010) selected by Elizabeth Robinson as the winner of the 2010 Omnidawn Chapbook Poetry Prize and a nonfiction book, Events Film Cannot Withstand (Rescue+Press, 2011 ). His poems, essays, and reviews have appeared in numerous journals and anthologies, including A Public Space, Colorado Review, the Denver Quarterly, Gulf Coast, and Best New Poets 2008.

Savich received a B.A. in English from the University of Washington an M.F.A. from the University of Iowa Writers’ Workshop and a second M.F.A from the program for Poets and Writers at University of Massachusetts Amherst.  He currently teaches at the University of the Arts, and serves as book review editor with The Kenyon Review.

References

External links 
 New American Poets, The Poetry Society of America
 Savich on Verse Daily
 Savich's Author Page on the Cleveland State University Poetry Center's Website
 Zach Savich's poem "Water Unflavored by the Apples In It" in Gulf Coast: A Journal of Literature and Fine Arts (23.1).

Iowa Writers' Workshop alumni
1982 births
Living people
American male poets
21st-century American poets
21st-century American male writers